= Conservation Technology Information Center =

The Conservation Tillage Information Center was established in January 1982. In 1987, the Center became the Conservation Technology Information Center to better define its mission. Today, CTIC, located in West Lafayette, Indiana, is a national, public-private partnership that envisions agriculture using environmentally beneficial and economically viable natural resource systems.

CTIC, a nonprofit 501(c)(3) organization, is composed of members of ag industry, ag publications, ag associations, conservation organizations and producers and is supported by the U.S. Environmental Protection Agency, Natural Resources Conservation Service and other public entities.

It is CTIC's mission to champion, promote and provide information about comprehensive conservation and sustainable agricultural systems that are beneficial for soil, water, air and wildlife resources and are productive and profitable for agriculture.
